Celeste Ng (born July 30, 1980) is an American writer and novelist. She has released many short stories that have been published in a variety of literary journals. Ng's first novel, Everything I Never Told You, released on June 26, 2014 won the Amazon Book of the Year award as well as praise from critics. Ng's short story Girls at Play won a Pushcart Prize in 2012, and was a 2015 recipient of an Alex Award. Her second novel, Little Fires Everywhere, was published in 2017. Ng received a Guggenheim Fellowship in 2020. Her most recent novel, Our Missing Hearts, was released on October 4, 2022.

Early life and education
Celeste Ng was born in Pittsburgh, Pennsylvania. Her parents moved from Hong Kong in the late 1960s. Her father Dr. Daniel L. Ng (d. 2004) was a physicist at NASA in the John H. Glenn Research Center (formerly known as the NASA Lewis Research Center). Her mother was a chemist who taught at Cleveland State University.

When Ng was ten years old, she moved from Pittsburgh to Shaker Heights, Ohio with her parents and sister. She attended the schools in the Shaker Heights City School District, from Woodbury Elementary all the way up to Shaker Heights High School. At Shaker Heights High School, Ng was involved with the Student Group on Race Relations ("SGORR") for three years and was a co-editor of the school's literary magazine, Semanteme. She graduated from high school in 1998.

After graduating from high school, Ng studied English at Harvard University. She then attended graduate school at University of Michigan, where she earned her Master of Fine Arts in writing, now the Helen Zell Writers’ Program. At the University of Michigan, Ng won the Hopwood Award for her short story "What Passes Over".

Career
Ng received the Pushcart Prize in 2012 for her story "Girls, At Play". Her fiction has appeared in One Story, TriQuarterly, and Subtropics. Her essays have appeared in Kenyon Review Online, The Millions, and elsewhere. Ng taught writing at the University of Michigan and at Grub Street in Boston. Ng also was an editor of blogs at the website Fiction Writers Review for three years.

Ng's debut novel, Everything I Never Told You: A Novel, is a literary thriller that focuses on an American family in 1970s Ohio. The novel had four drafts and one revision before completion, which took six years. Working on it, Ng said she drew upon her own experiences of racism as well as her family and friends. The book, which the Los Angeles Times called an "excellent first novel about family, love, and ambition," won Amazon’s  book of the year award in 2014 and was a New York Times Notable Book of 2014. It has been translated into 15 languages. In 2020, it was reported that Annapurna Television would develop the novel into a limited series. Ng and Mary Lee of production company A-Major Media will serve as executive producers.

Ng's second novel, Little Fires Everywhere, is set in Shaker Heights, Ohio, and follows two families, one a mother and daughter, that challenge the boundaries and culture of the town. The novel was developed into a 2020 Hulu miniseries of the same name starring and executive produced by Reese Witherspoon and Kerry Washington; Ng also served as one of the show's producers.

Personal life 
As of 2014, Ng resides in Cambridge, Massachusetts, with her husband and son. 

While on a book tour for Everything I Never Told You, Ng said her favorite book as a child was Harriet the Spy. As an adult, one of her favorite books is The God of Small Things by Arundhati Roy. 

In 2018, when the American government separated the children and parents of undocumented immigrant families, Ng used her Twitter account to call attention to the policy. Ng and a group of other writers auctioned naming rights of future characters in their books. The goal was to raise money for Immigrant Families Together, a volunteer group dedicated to reuniting migrant families.

Bibliography

References

External links

1980 births
Living people
People from Shaker Heights, Ohio
American people of Hong Kong descent
American women writers of Chinese descent
21st-century American novelists
21st-century American women writers
American novelists of Chinese descent
American women novelists
Harvard University alumni
University of Michigan alumni